Ron Cephas Jones (born January 8, 1957) is an American actor. He is best known for his role as William Hill in the drama series This Is Us (2016–2022), which earned him four consecutive Primetime Emmy Award nominations, winning twice for Outstanding Guest Actor in a Drama Series in 2018 and 2020.

Jones appeared in television series such as Mr. Robot (2015–2016), The Get Down (2016–2017), Luke Cage (2016–2018), and Truth Be Told (2019-present). He also appeared in a number of films, including Half Nelson (2006), Across the Universe (2007), Glass Chin (2014), The Holiday Calendar (2018), Dog Days (2018), and Dolemite Is My Name (2019).

Early life
Jones was born on January 8, 1957, in Paterson, New Jersey. He attended John F. Kennedy High School and graduated from Ramapo College. While at Ramapo, Jones had originally intended to study jazz under director Arnold Jones (no relation), but changed majors to theater after getting the lead in a production of Cinderella Ever After his sophomore year.

Jones graduated from Ramapo in 1978, after which he moved to Los Angeles, California and drove a bus for the Southern California Rapid Transit District for the next four years. During that time, Jones stated he "fell in love, had a child, got separated". He then "traveled around", living in San Francisco, Arizona, and New Orleans before returning to New York City in 1985.

Career
After returning to New York in 1985, Jones began spending time at the Nuyorican Poets Café in Manhattan's East Village. During that time, he performed in a play based on the Billie Holiday song Don't Explain. His performance caught the attention of a casting director, which led to Jones being offered the lead role in the Tazewell Thompson production of the Cheryl West play Holiday Heart in 1994. Jones has performed in several theatrical productions with the Steppenwolf Theatre Company in Chicago, Illinois; appeared as the title character of Shakespeare's Richard III with The Public Theater in New York City, New York, as well as other Off Broadway productions.  Jones has served as an understudy or standby in several Broadway theatre productions. In 2014 Jones starred as Prometheus in Prometheus Bound directed by Travis Preston through the CalArts Center for New Performance.

His film credits include He Got Game (1998), Sweet and Lowdown (1999), Half Nelson (2006), and Across The Universe (2007). In television, he appeared as Reverend Lowdown in the episode "The Goat Rodeo" of the 2013 television series Low Winter Sun and he played Romero, a member of "fsociety" in the 2015 television series Mr. Robot. He also appeared on season 3 of the show Banshee as Philadelphia kingpin, Mr. Frasier. He played Harlem chess master Bobby Fish in season 1 of Marvel's Luke Cage. Since 2016, Jones stars on the NBC drama series This Is Us as William Hill, the biological father of Randall Pearson (Sterling K. Brown). Jones received critical acclaim for his performance on This Is Us and received a Primetime Emmy Award for Outstanding Guest Actor in a Drama Series in 2018 and 2020 for his performance.

Currently, Jones appears in the Hulu teen drama series Looking for Alaska, as well as the Apple TV+ crime drama series Truth Be Told, opposite Octavia Spencer, Lizzy Caplan and Aaron Paul.

Personal life
Jones and British-born jazz singer Kim Lesley have a daughter, American stage and screen actress Jasmine Cephas Jones.

Filmography

Film

Television

Video games

Awards and nominations

See also
 Lists of actors
 List of people from Chicago
 Jasmine Cephas Jones
 List of people from New York City

References

External links

 
 
 

20th-century births
Place of birth missing (living people)
20th-century American male actors
21st-century American male actors
African-American male actors
American male film actors
American male stage actors
American male television actors
American male Shakespearean actors
John F. Kennedy High School (Paterson, New Jersey) alumni
Living people
Male actors from Chicago
Male actors from New York City
Theatre in Chicago
1957 births
People from Paterson, New Jersey
Primetime Emmy Award winners
Ramapo College alumni